Cortlever is a surname. Notable people with the surname include:

Nicolaas Cortlever, (1915–1995), Dutch chess master
Johan Cortlever, (1885–1972), Dutch swimmer